Orthogonius planiger is a species of ground beetle in the subfamily Orthogoniinae. It was described by Francis Walker in 1858.

References

planiger
Beetles described in 1858